Raufarhöfn is a village located on the northeastern tip of the Melrakkaslétta  peninsula in Iceland.

History 

At one point in time, this small village was home to largest export harbor in Iceland. In the forties and fifties, the Herring frenzy dominated the Icelandic economy and Raufarhöfn was an important place in that economic chain. But after the herring disappeared the effect was devastating for the village. This is the reason for the old and interesting factory buildings.
The village is the site of a modern monument called the "Arctic Henge" which is aligned to the heavens and is inspired by the mythical world of the Eddic poem Völuspá (Prophecy of the Seeress).
As of 2019, it has 188 inhabitants. It was a major fish processing station during the large herring catches in the mid 20th century.

Sights 
The church was built in 1928 by Guðjón Samúelsson, one of the most important Icelandic architects, and inaugurated on 1 January 1929. It was renovated in 1979. Circa 1996, a large stone monument, "Arctic Henge" (Heimskautsgerði  in Icelandic), was constructed close to the village. Inspired by historic stone circles as of 2021 the site is still under construction.

Climate 

The climate is tundra (Koppen: ET). As the northernmost community of mainland Iceland, Raufarhöfn is also the coldest with an annual average of 2.0 °C.

See also 
 Hraunhafnartangi Lighthouse

References

External links 
 Raufarhofn
 More information and photos about Raufarhöfn on Hit Iceland

Populated places in Northeastern Region (Iceland)